Sea Breeze is an unincorporated community located within Fairfield Township in Cumberland County, New Jersey, United States. It is located on the shores of the Delaware Bay.

History
In 1887, steamboat travel between Philadelphia and Sea Breeze began.  After two aspiring businessmen from Gloucester restored an old Civil War boat (named the John A. Warner), a regular service was run throughout the summer to Sea Breeze's amusement pier.

Later that year, The Warner House opened at Sea Breeze.  The Warner house was a 40-room hotel, complete with a bar, and offered bathing as well as numerous recreational activities to visitors.  Annual clambakes and boat races were also held.  The Warner House burned down in 1890.

By the early 20th century, Jesse Smith built Sea Breeze's second hotel, The Seabreeze Hotel.  During this time a man named Harry Griffith would rent rowboats on the bay, and is alleged to have provided alcohol during Prohibition.  The new hotel suffered a similar fate as the Warner House and was destroyed by a fire in the 1940s.

Following the repeal of Prohibition, Griffith obtained a liquor license and opened the Sea Breeze tavern.  Although it started out in a nearby barge, it later expanded to three rooms.  By the 1940s, Griffith's daughter Mae had added food to the tavern.  Although Harry Griffith died in the 1960s, the tavern was run by his family up until 1985, when it was destroyed by Hurricane Gloria.

The hamlet is home to a small community of seasonal homes and does not have many year round residents.  There is one road in Sea Breeze, Beach Avenue and it is unpaved.  There are no marinas or businesses, but Sea Breeze is still used by salt water fisherman and bird watchers.

In November 2008, six of the 19 homeowners in Sea Breeze asked the New Jersey Department of Environmental Protection to buy their properties. A recently constructed seawall had been badly damaged by the waves, leaving the properties at great risk.

On May 17, 2010, NJN News reported the remaining homeowners have agreed to sell their property to the state.

In August 2010, two of the homes burned down. In July 2011 another home burned down.

In early January 2012, the state and EPA tore down the houses.

References

External links 
Fairfield Township

Fairfield Township, Cumberland County, New Jersey
Unincorporated communities in Cumberland County, New Jersey
Unincorporated communities in New Jersey